Mitoizumi Masayuki (born 2 September 1962 as Masato Koizumi) is a former sumo wrestler from Mito, Ibaraki, Japan. His professional career spanned 22 years, from 1978 until 2000. The highest rank he reached was sekiwake. He won over 800 career bouts and took the yūshō or championship in the top makuuchi division in 1992. Mitoizumi was nicknamed the "Salt Shaker", due to his habit of throwing enormous quantities of purifying salt onto the ring (dohyō) during the pre-match preliminaries. He is now a coach, and is known as Nishikido Oyakata.

Career

Mitoizumi was discovered by Takamiyama, a famous Hawaiian born sumo wrestler, who met the 16-year-old and his brother at a department store where Takamiyama was making a personal appearance. He was persuaded to join Takasago stable and made his professional debut in March 1978. Initially fighting under his own surname of Koizumi, he switched to the shikona of Mitoizumi (reference to his birthplace) in 1981. He was troubled early in his career by illness and in 1982 he seriously injured his knee and was hospitalised for four months, causing him to miss tournaments and plunge down the rankings. This was just one of many injuries he would have to battle with over the course of his long career.

He made the breakthrough to the salaried sekitori ranks in May 1984 when he reached the jūryō division, in the same tournament in which Takamiyama announced his retirement. Mitoizumi was promoted to the top makuuchi division just two tournaments later in September 1984. However, he was to suffer more misfortune. Just before the May 1985 tournament he was involved in a motor accident, receiving cuts to his face; and was forced to sit out part of the tournament. After the next tournament, he was demoted back to jūryō. In September 1986, after he had managed to return to the top division and reach a new highest rank of sekiwake, he injured his knee again in a bout with ōzeki Ōnokuni and returned to the second division once more. It took him until January 1988 to fight his way back to the top division, but this time he was to remain there for the next eleven years.

Mitoizumi was ranked at sekiwake on several more occasions and won seven special prizes, but the highlight of his career came in July 1992, when he took the top division tournament championship for the only time. Ranked at maegashira 1, he took advantage of the absence of the top ranked wrestler at the time, ōzeki Akebono, and clinched the championship on the 14th day with a win over Takanonami. He finished on 13-2, two wins ahead of his nearest challengers Kirishima and Musashimaru.

Mitoizumi was never able to reach those heights again, but after his final appearance in the san'yaku ranks in November 1992 he remained in the top division until March 1999. He carried on fighting in the jūryō division until September 2000, when he finally announced his retirement at the age of 38, rather than be demoted to the third makushita division. He had been an active wrestler for more than 22 years. His tally of 807 career wins is the twelfth highest in sumo history. He never earned any kinboshi, as all his victories over yokozuna came when he was fighting at komusubi or sekiwake rank.

Mitoizumi's nickname of the "Salt Shaker" was given to him by British sumo fans who followed his matches on Channel 4 and in the exhibition at the Royal Albert Hall in 1991. It referred to his habit during the pre-match rituals (but only on the final throw) of grabbing a huge handful of purifying salt and flinging it high into the air. After his retirement his routine was taken up by maegashira Kitazakura.

Retirement from sumo
Mitoizumi's official retirement ceremony (danpatsu-shiki) took place on 9 June 2001, with a record 470 patrons, wrestlers and coaches taking part in the hair-cutting ritual. He remained in the sumo world as a coach at Takasago stable under the elder name Nishikido Oyakata and he effectively led it during the illness of its head, former komusubi Fujinishiki. However, he lost out on the chance to succeed him, due to personal problems with his fiancée from whom he eventually split. Instead, control of Takasago stable passed to former ōzeki Asashio who merged it with Wakamatsu stable. As a result, in December 2002 Mitoizumi instead opened up his own training stable, or heya, Nishikido stable. The stable did not produce a sekitori until November 2017 when Mitoryū was promoted to jūryō. Unusually for the head of a stable, he remained single for many years, before marrying a soprano, Yukiko Ono, in February 2016. Nishikido also works as a judge of tournament bouts.

Fighting style
Mitoizumi was not noted as a technician, and never won a Technique prize. His most common winning kimarite was overwhelmingly yori-kiri, a straightforward force out, which accounted for over half of his victories at sekitori level. However, due to his height and strength he also regularly employed kimedashi, or arm barring force out, a technique seldom seen today.

Family
Mitoizumi's younger brother, Umenosato, was also a sumo wrestler at Takasago stable. He fought for 21 years from 1980 to 2001 but only made the jūryō division on one occasion in July 1993. He now works at Nishikido stable as a manager.

Career record

See also
Glossary of sumo terms
List of past sumo wrestlers
List of sumo elders
List of sumo tournament top division champions
List of sumo tournament top division runners-up
List of sekiwake

References

External links

 Mitoizumi's tournament results
 Profile of Nishikido stable

1962 births
Living people
Japanese sumo wrestlers
People from Mito, Ibaraki
Sumo people from Ibaraki Prefecture
Sekiwake